Mitrofan is a Slavic name derived from Greek Μητροφάνης : μήτηρ "mother + φαίνω, "appear, shine". Its English equivalent is Metrophanes.

Derived names:
 Mitrokha/Mitroha/Mitroshka, Russian diminutive; Mitrofanushka, Russian hypocoristic

Derived patronymics:
 Mitrofanovich (masculine), Mitrofanovna (feminine)

Derived surnames:  Mitrofanov/Mitrofanova, Russian; Mitrokhin/Mitrokhina, Russian; Mitrofanenko, Ukrainian

The name may refer to:
 Mitrofan Ban, Montenegrin bishop
 Mitrofan Cioban, a Moldovan mathematician
 Mitrofan Belyayev, a Russian music publisher, founder of the Glinka prize
 Mitrofan Dovnar-Zapol'skiy, a Belarusian historian and ethnographer
 Mitrofan Pyatnitsky, a Russian musician
 Mitrofan Nedelin, Soviet military commander
 Mihai Mitrofan
 Sandu Mitrofan
 Mitrofan Kodić

Given names of Greek language origin
Romanian masculine given names
Romanian-language surnames